Euphyllia is a genus of large-polyped stony coral. Several species are commonly found in marine aquariums. The genus includes the following species:

 Euphyllia baliensis Turak, Devantier & Erdman, 2012 – bubble coral
 Euphyllia cristata Chevalier, 1971 – grape coral
 Euphyllia glabrescens (Chamisso & Eysenhardt, 1821) – torch coral
 Euphyllia paraglabrescens Veron, 1990

The following species have been taxonomically reclassified into the Fimbriaphyllia genus under the Caryophylliidae family

 Euphyllia ancora (Reclassified as Fimbriaphyllia ancora)Veron & Pichon, 1980 – hammer coral
 Euphyllia divisa (Reclassified as Fimbriaphyllia divisa)Veron & Pichon, 1980 – frogspawn coral
 Euphyllia paraancora (Reclassified as Fimbriaphyllia paraancora)Veron, 1990 –  branching hammer coral
 Euphyllia paradivisa (Reclassified as Fimbriaphyllia paradivisa)Veron, 1990 – branching frogspawn coral
 Euphyllia yaeyamaensis (Reclassified as Fimbriaphyllia yaeyamaensis)(Shirai, 1980) - Thick branched frogspawn coral

References

Euphylliidae
Scleractinia genera
Taxa named by James Dwight Dana